Shuman Glacier is a glacier about 6 miles (10 km) long draining through the Ruppert Coast north of Strauss Glacier. Named by Advisory Committee on Antarctic Names (US-ACAN) after Christopher A. Shuman, faculty, Earth System Science Interdisciplinary Center, University of Maryland, field and theoretical researcher in the West Antarctic Ice Stream area from the 1990s to the present.

References

Glaciers of Marie Byrd Land